The following is a hierarchical outline for the British Armed Forces at the end of the Cold War. It is intended to convey the connections and relationships between units and formations.

In 1989 the British Armed Forces had a peacetime strength of 311,600 men, and defence expenditures were 4.09% of GDP. The strength of the Royal Navy in 1989 was 65,500; that of the British Army: 152,800; and that of the Royal Air Force 93,300.

Ministry of Defence 
Within the MOD Main Building in London, the Ministry of Defence, through the Defence Council of the United Kingdom, supervised the Army Board, Admiralty Board, and the Air Force Board. 

The Minister for Defence Procurement had political responsibility for the Ministry of Defence Procurement Executive, which supervised the Atomic Weapons Establishment at Aldermaston (including the Royal Ordnance Factories at ROF Burghfield and ROF Cardiff), as well as seven other research establishments. They included the Admiralty Research Establishment, Portsdown; the Aeroplane and Armament Experimental Establishment, RAF Boscombe Down; the Chemical Defence Establishment, Porton Down; the Microbiological Research Establishment, Porton Down; the Royal Armament Research and Development Establishment, Fort Halstead; the Royal Aircraft Establishment at RAE Farnborough and RAE Bedford; and the Royal Signals and Radar Establishment, at Malvern. 

Other MoD organisations included:
 the Ministry of Defence Police
 the Judge Advocate General of the Armed Forces
 the Defence Nuclear, Biological and Chemical School, Winterbourne Gunner
 Defence Intelligence Staff
 Welbeck College, Worksop
 the Defence Test and Evaluation Organisation, Portland Bill
 the Chief Scientific Adviser to the Ministry of Defence
 and Defence Munitions depots at Crombie, Glen Douglas and Gosport.

British Army forces in Brunei
 HQ British Forces Brunei & Brunei Signal Troop, Queen's Gurkha Signals (Seria, Brunei)
 1st Btn, 10th Princess Mary's Own Gurkha Rifles
 C Flight, 660 Squadron AAC, Anduki Airfield, (Scout AH.1)
 Brunei Troop, Gurkha Transport Regiment

Director Special Forces
 Director Special Forces, commands United Kingdom Special Forces
 Special Air Service, Stirling Lines, Hereford
 HQ Special Air Service & 264 (SAS) Signal Squadron, Hereford
 22nd Special Air Service Regiment, Stirling Lines, Hereford
 8 Flight AAC, (4x A109A Hirundo), Stirling Lines, Hereford
 Special Air Service Group, (Stay-behind Observation Posts and Long Range Reconnaissance Patrols for I British Corps)
 63 (SAS) Signal Squadron (V), Thorney Island
 21 Special Air Service Regiment (Artists) (V), Chelsea
 23 Special Air Service Regiment (V), Birmingham
 Special Boat Service, Royal Marines, Poole
 14 Intelligence Company, British Army, RAF Aldergrove

Joint establishments

Joint establishments were tri-service units providing services to all three branches of the British Armed Forces.
 Joint Service Defence College, Greenwich
 Joint Forward Air Controller Training and Standards Unit, RAF Leeming

Defence Operations Executive

The Defence Operations Executive, led by the Deputy Chief of the Defence Staff (Commitments) and including the Assistant Chiefs of the Naval, General, and Air Staffs, supervised the Joint Operations Centre which in turn passed orders to the forces in Cyprus, Belize, the Falklands, and Hong Kong. These commands consisted of units of all three services and were commanded by one or 2-star rank flag officers. CBF Cyprus was a rotational post between the Army and RAF, at two-star level; CBF Belize was an Army brigadier; CBF Falklands was a rotational post between all three services at two-star level; and CBF Hong Kong was an Army major general.

 Joint Air Transport Establishment, RAF Brize Norton (under Commitments umbrella)

British Forces Belize

The Commander British Forces Belize was a British Army Brigadier.

 British Forces Belize, Belize City, Belize
 British Army, Price Barracks, Ladyville
 1st Btn, Welsh Guards, six month roulement from April to October 1989
 1x Armoured Reconnaissance Troop, six month roulement
 1x Field Battery, Royal Artillery, six month roulement
 1x Field Squadron, Royal Engineers, six month roulement
 24th Squadron, Royal Corps of Transport
 78th Ordnance Company, Royal Army Ordnance Corps
 25 Flight AAC, Belize Airport, Ladyville, (Gazelle AH.1)
 Royal Air Force, Belize Airport, Ladyville
 No. 1417 Flight RAF, (Harrier GR.3)
 No. 1563 Flight RAF, (Puma HC.1)
 1x Air Defence Troop, RAF Regiment, six month roulement, (2× Rapier launch stations)
 Royal Navy
 West Indies Guard Ship, as needed.

British Forces Cyprus

The post of Commander British Forces Cyprus rotated between British Army and Royal Navy 2-star rank flag officers (Major General and Rear admiral).

 British Forces Cyprus, Episkopi, Cyprus
 HQ, British Forces Cyprus, Episkopi
 British Army:
 2nd Btn, Coldstream Guards, Episkopi, two-year deployment: February 1988 to February 1990
 9th Signal Regiment (Radio), Royal Signals, at Ayios Nikolaos Signals Intelligence station
 30th Transport Regiment, Royal Corps of Transport, Episkopi
 B Squadron, 17th/21st Lancers, Episkopi, six month roulement
 62nd Cyprus Support Squadron, Royal Engineers, Dhekelia
 259th Signal Squadron, Episkopi
 262nd Signal Squadron, Dhekelia
 16 Flight AAC, Kingsfield Airfield in Dhekelia, (Gazelle AH.1)
 UNFICYP Flight AAC, Nicosia Airport, (Gazelle AH.1, supported the United Nations Peacekeeping Force in Cyprus)
 Royal Air Force:
 No. 84 Squadron RAF, RAF Akrotiri (Wessex HC.2)
 No. 34 Squadron RAF Regiment, RAF Akrotiri, (Light Armour, 15× Spartan, 6× Scorpion)
 No. 13 Signals Unit, RAF Episkopi
 No. 33 Signals Unit, Ayios Nikolaos, (Signals intelligence)
 No. 280 Signals Unit, RAF Troodos, (Signals intelligence)

British Forces Falkland Islands

The post of Commander British Forces Falkland Islands rotated between British Army, Royal Navy and Royal Air Force 2-star rank flag officers (either a Major General, Rear admiral or Air vice-marshal).

 British Forces Falkland Islands, RAF Mount Pleasant, Falkland Islands
 HQ British Forces Falkland Islands & Joint Communications Unit Falklands Islands,
 Joint Force Workshop, RAF Mount Pleasant
 Falkland Islands Defence Force, Stanley
 British Army, RAF Mount Pleasant
 Infantry company from 1st Btn, Cheshire Regiment, six month roulement April to October 1989; replaced by infantry company from 1st Btn, Green Howards
 1x Artillery Battery, Royal Artillery, six month roulement (6x L118 Light Guns)
 1x Field Squadron, Royal Engineers, six month roulement
 1x Air Defence Troop, Royal Artillery, six month roulement, (12x Javelin)
 67th Port Squadron, Royal Corps of Transport
 73rd Squadron, Royal Corps of Transport
 77th Ordnance Company, Royal Army Ordnance Corps
 Royal Air Force, RAF Mount Pleasant
 No. 78 Squadron RAF, (Air assault CH-47 Chinook HC.1, Search & Rescue Sea King HAR.3)
 No. 1435 Flight RAF, (Phantom FGR.2)
 No. 1312 Flight RAF, (Aerial refueling Hercules C.1K)
 No. 7 Signals Unit RAF, Byron Heights, West Falkland
 No. 303 Signals Unit
 No. 751 Signals Unit, Mount Alice (Falkland Islands)
 1x Air Defence Troop, RAF Regiment, six month roulement, (2× Rapier launch stations)
 HMS Leeds Castle, Castle-class patrol vessel of the Royal Navy, based at Stanley with crew on a six-month roulement

British Forces Hong Kong

The Commander British Forces Hong Kong was a British Army Major General.

 Commander British Forces Hong Kong, Hong Kong
 HQ British Forces Hong Kong & 248th Gurkha Signal Squadron, Headquarters House
 British Army, Prince of Wales Building
 48th Gurkha Infantry Brigade
 HQ 48th Gurkha Infantry Brigade & 246th Gurkha Signal Squadron
 1st Btn, Duke of Edinburgh's Royal Regiment, Stanley Fort
 1st Btn, 6th Queen Elizabeth's Own Gurkha Rifles
 1st Btn, 7th Duke of Edinburgh's Own Gurkha Rifles
 2nd Btn, 2nd King Edward VII's Own Gurkha Rifles, Gallipoli Lines
 Queen's Gurkha Signals
 247th Gurkha Signal Squadron
 Queen's Gurkha Engineers
 67th Gurkha Field Squadron
 68th Gurkha Field Squadron
 70th Support Squadron
 Gurkha Transport Regiment
 28th Gurkha Transport Squadron
 29th Transport Squadron
 31st Gurkha Transport Squadron
 660 Squadron AAC, RAF Sek Kong, (Scout AH.1, C Flight detached to British Forces Brunei)
 50th Command Workshop, Royal Electrical and Mechanical Engineers
 Hong Kong Provost Company & Hong Kong Dog Company, Royal Military Police
 415th Maritime Troop, Royal Corps of Transport
 British Military Hospital, Hong Kong
 Hong Kong Military Service Corps
 Defence Animal Support Unit, Royal Army Veterinary Corps
 Commander Royal Air Force, RAF Sek Kong
 No. 28 Squadron RAF, (8x Wessex HC.2)
 Captain-in-Charge Royal Navy, HMS Tamar
 Hong Kong Patrol Squadron, HMS Tamar with:
 Peacock-class corvettes: HMS Peacock, HMS Plover, HMS Starling
 Hong Kong Royal Naval Volunteer Reserve

The two local auxiliary defence forces were administered by the Hong Kong Government, but when mobilized for active service would have come under the command of the Commander British Forces:
 Royal Hong Kong Regiment (The Volunteers) (V)
 Royal Hong Kong Auxiliary Air Force, Kai Tak Airport, (4x T-67M-200 Firefly, 2x B200C King Air, 3x SA-365-C Dauphin 2, 1x BN-2 Islander)

See also
 Outline of the British Army in 1989
 Structure of the Royal Navy in 1989
 Structure of the Royal Air Force in 1989
 Outline of military science and technology

References

Military history of the United Kingdom
Military units and formations of the United Kingdom
British Armed Forces at the end of the Cold War